District scolaire 05 (or School District 05) was a Canadian school district in New Brunswick.

District 05 was a Francophone district operating 22 public schools (gr. K-12) in Gloucester and Restigouche counties.

Current enrollment is approximately 5,930 students and 400 teachers.  District 05 was headquartered in Campbellton.

On February 24, 2012, the Department of Education and Early Childhood Development changes the province districts from 14 to 7 districts. The School District 05 is now a part of, but not limited to, the northeast district: Campbellton, Bathurst and Acadian Peninsula regions (nine sub-districts).

List of schools

High schools
 École Aux quatre vents
 École Secondaire Népisiguit
 Polyvalante Roland-Pépin

Middle schools
 Le Domaine-Étudiant
 Place-des-Jeunes

Elementary schools
 Apollo-XI
 Assomption
 Cité-de-l'Amitié
 La Découverte-de-Saint-Sauveur
 Le Coin-des-Amis
 Le Rendez-vous-des-Jeunes
 Le Tournesol
 Mgr-Melanson

Combined elementary and middle schools
 Arthur-Pinet
 Carrefour-Étudiant
 François-Xavier-Daigle
 La Croisée de Robertville
 Le Domaine-des-Copains
 Notre-Dame
 Séjour-Jeunesse
 Versant-Nord

Other schools
 Centre d'apprentissage communautaire (École Aux quatre vents)
 Centre d'apprentissage communautaire (Polyvalente Roland-Pépin)
 Centre d'apprentissage communautaire (École Secondaire Népisiguit)

External links
 https://web.archive.org/web/20070207132749/http://www.district5.nbed.nb.ca/
 Announcement of the new school districts in New Brunswick http://www2.gnb.ca/content/gnb/en/news/news_release.2012.02.0145.html

Former school districts in New Brunswick